Shatabdi Express trains are a series of fast passenger trains operated by Indian Railways to connect important metro cities.  Shatabdi Express are day-trains and mostly return to their origin station the same day. The trains were first introduced in 1988 and were named 'Shatabdi', meaning 'century', to commemorate the birth centenary of India's first Prime Minister Jawaharlal Nehru. 

Generally, the maximum permissible speed of the Shatabdi Express (except the fastest one) is 130 kmph where the proper infrastructure exists and lower where the proper infrastructure does not exist, but the maximum permissible speed of the fastest Shatabdi Express, Rani Kamlapati–New Delhi Shatabdi Express (Rani Kamlapati, formerly known as Habibganj station is in Bhopal) is 150 km/h  between Tughlakabad and Agra Cantt part (about whole part of New Delhi - Agra Cantt) since 2006 and Gatimaan Express has a maximum permissible speed of 160 kmph over the same part, and as per maximum permissible speed this fastest Shatabdi Express (then between New Delhi and Bhopal before extension of the route) was the fastest train in India before the introduction of the Gatimaan Express on 5th April 2016      and Some of the Shatabdi Express trains can't touch 130 kmph in any part of their routes because of lack of infrastructure.

History
The name "Shatabdi" means century in Sanskrit. The first Shatabdi Express train was announced on 10 July 1988 by then Railways Minister Madhavrao Scindia to commemorate the birth centenary of Jawaharlal Nehru, the first Prime Minister of India and plyed between New Delhi and Jhansi Junction.

Service

Shatabdi Express trains offer fast connectivity between major metropolitan cities with only a few intermediate stops and can run at a maximum speed of 150 km/h. They are fully air-conditioned and passengers are provided with bottled water, juice, coffee or tea, and meals relevant to the time of day of the journey. New onboard entertainment systems have also been installed on some of these trains where the passengers can view movies and other content directly via satellite.

Seats in Shatabdi Express have to be reserved in advance as there is no unreserved accommodation unlike most of the other trains in India. Reservation is allowed until up to 30 minutes before the scheduled departure time. The seats are auto allocated by the reservation system. Dynamic pricing is applicable on the fares.

Rolling Stock
As Shatabdi Express are day-trains and return to the station of origin the same day, coaches have only seats and not berths. All of these trains have multiple AC Chair Car coaches and generally Shatabdi Express has one or two coaches of Executive Class seating. Indian Railways offers Anubhuti Class seating in some of the trains and Vistadome coaches offering large windows, transparent roofing and rotatable seats. in some of the trains 

The trains used to operate on specialized coaches manufactured by ICF, Chennai. These coaches have now been replaced with newer LHB rakess on all the trains. 

The trains are hauled by various diesel or electric locomotives. Indian Railways introduced a new specialized high speed locomotive class WAP-7HS with a maximum speed of 180 km/h for hauling Shatabdi express trains in 2019.

List of Shatabdi trains 
Indian Railways operates 21 pairs of Shatabdi Express trains.

See also

References

External links 

Railway services introduced in 1988
Shatabdi Express trains
Named passenger trains of India